Mythopoeic ("of or pertaining to myth-making", noun mythopoeia; also mythopoetic, noun mythopoesis) may refer to:
Mythopoeic thought, a hypothetical stage of human thought (prior to scientific thought) that produces myths.
Mythopoeia, a word used as the title of a poem by mythology scholar and fantasy author J. R. R. Tolkien to mean "myth-making"; it has since become a literature- and film-genre of myth-like fictional narratives, especially in the high fantasy tradition
Mythopoeic Society, devoted to fantastic literature including that of Tolkien and his friends
Mythopoeic Awards, given annually for outstanding works in the fields of myth, fantasy, and the scholarly study of these areas
Mythopoetic men's movement, a subset of the men's movement that seeks to reconnect men to a lost "deep masculine" identity